The 2014 Algarve Cup was the 21st edition of the Algarve Cup, an invitational women's football tournament held annually in Portugal. It took place between 5–12 March 2014.

Format
The twelve invited teams are split into three groups that played a round-robin tournament.

Since the expansion to 12 teams 13 years ago, the Algarve Cup format has been as follows: Groups A and B, containing the strongest ranked teams, are the only ones in contention to win the title. The group A and B winners contest the final - to win the Algarve Cup. The runners-up play for third place, and those that finish third in the groups play for fifth place.  The teams in Group C played for places 7–12. The winner of Group C played the team that finished fourth in Group A or B (whichever has the better record) for seventh place. The Group C runner-up played the team who finishes last in Group A or B (with the worse record) for ninth place. The third and fourth-placed teams in Group C played for the eleventh place.

Points awarded in the group stage followed the standard formula of three points for a win, one point for a draw and zero points for a loss. In the case of two teams being tied on the same number of points in a group, their head-to-head result determined the higher place.

Teams
Listed are the confirmed teams.

Squads

Match officials
The appointed match officials are.

 Teodora Albon (Romania)
 Melissa Borjas (Honduras)
 Sheena Dickson (Canada)
 Cristina Dorcioman (Romania)
 Stéphanie Frappart (France)
 Rita Gani (Malaysia)
 Riem Hussein (Germany)

 Yeimy Martinèz (Colombia)
 Efthalia Mitsi (Greece)
 Olga Miranda (Paraguay)
 Therese Neguel (Cameroon)
 Casey Reibelt (Australia)
 Wang Jia (China)

Group stage
All times are local (WET/UTC+0).
The schedule was announced in February 2014.

Group A

Group B

Group C

Placement play-offs

Eleventh place match

Ninth place match

Seventh place match

Fifth place match

Third place match

Final

Final standings

References

External links

ALGARVE CUP 2014 – Japan Football Association

 
2014 in women's association football
2013–14 in Portuguese football
2014
March 2014 sports events in Europe
2014 in Portuguese women's sport